The following lists events and other items of interest occurring during 2015 in Estonia.

Incumbents
 President: Toomas Hendrik Ilves 
 Prime Minister: Taavi Rõivas

Events

March
1 March - Parliamentary elections are held. The ruling Reform Party wins the elections, but loses the majority that it has had with its current coalition partner, the Social Democratic Party; for the first time in many years, two new parties cross the election threshold, the right-of-centre Free Party and the eurosceptic Conservative People's Party of Estonia.

Deaths
27 January - Vladimir-Georg Karassev-Orgusaar, 83, film director 
21 June - Arved Viirlaid, 93, Estonian-Canadian writer
30 July - Endel Lippmaa, 84, scientist and politician

See also
2015 in Estonian television

References 

 
2010s in Estonia
Estonia
Estonia
Years of the 21st century in Estonia